Christmastide is an extended play by singer and songwriter Tori Amos. Released on December 4, 2020, it is her second release to feature holiday-themed material after 2009's Midwinter Graces, and the first of which to contain exclusively original material.

"Better Angels" was released as a single preceding the EP on November 25, 2020.

Background and release
On the EP, Amos stated:

The album was released to streaming, as a digital download, and on vinyl, with cover artwork by graphic artist Rantz Hoseley. While it did not chart on the US Billboard 200, it did reach number 79 on the Top Current Album Sales chart.

Reception

The EP received generally positive reviews from music critics, including a five-star score from the Financial Times.

Track listing

All songs written by Tori Amos.

Side one

 "Christmastide" – 3:45
 "Circle of Seasons" – 5:11

Side two

 "Holly" – 3:39
 "Better Angels" – 4:00

Personnel

Tori Amos – Bösendorfer piano, keyboards, vocals
Matt Chamberlain - drums, percussion
Jon Evans – bass guitar, upright bass
Mac Aladdin - guitar
Tash – additional vocals (track 1)

Charts

References

2020 EPs
Decca Records EPs
Tori Amos EPs